Space trade is interplanetary or interstellar trade. Plans and ideas on how trade functions have been published by Futurists and pundits since the 1960s, though science fiction writers have been envisioning such trade for several more decades.

Reality 
Though the existence of interstellar trade is unknown, there are several theories developed by well known economists such as Paul Krugman on how trade calculations and interest rates would have to be adjusted in such a circumstance. At very high velocities, for example a space station traveling at significant speeds relative to the speed of light, there will be time dilation. In 2004 Espen Gaarder Haug published a technical research article in Wilmott Magazine on how interest rates and securities calculations had to be adjusted for very high velocities to avoid arbitrage. He published similar theories on what he called "SpaceTime Finance" in a book published in 2007 titled Derivatives Models on Models. Paul Krugman, winner of the Nobel Memorial Prize in Economic Sciences, published a research article on interstellar trade in 2010.

A motivator for colonization of Mars 

Several people have considered trade within the Solar System as one of the ways in which colonization of Mars is both important and can be made self-sufficient. Robert Zubrin, of Lockheed Martin Astronautics, in a paper on the economic viability of colonizing Mars, puts forward interplanetary trade as one way in which a hypothetical Martian colony could become rich, pointing out that the energy relationships between the orbits of Earth, Mars, and the asteroid belt place Mars in a far better position for involvement in any future asteroid mining trade than Earth.

Jim Plaxco, in a paper putting forward the case for colonizing Mars, mentions that Phobos and Deimos can be developed, in the long term, from being short-term testbeds for the techniques of asteroid mining and staging posts for colonization of Mars itself, into key trading posts in interplanetary trade, again because of their favourable position within the Solar System.

It is theorized that if different locations within the Solar System become inhabited by humans, they would need to transport valuable resources between different planets, moons and asteroids. The asteroid belt is theorized to become a source of valuable ores that may develop into industrial asteroid mining infrastructure, whereas Earth may export hi-tech production. The factor of energy-efficiency of interplanetary transportation may become very important to estimate economic value of a trade route.

John Hickman identified the principal obstacle to developing space trade as the distances involved, which will reduce all or nearly all trade to the exchange of intangible goods. That threatens the possibility of conducting business in a genuinely common currency and of enforcing debt agreements incurred by governments.

Building commercial spaceports 
Building high-capacity commercial spaceports may require connection with other modes of transportation, such as railroad or sea, which would make spaceports another dimension of national economy. One analysis of commercial, technical, and logistical concerns for an operating spaceport, formulated by the Spaceport Technology Development Office of NASA, is Vision Spaceport.

See also

Commercial uses of space
Helium-3 (although it cannot currently be exploited as an energy source, that may change in the future if fusion power is developed)
Space-based solar power
Space manufacturing

Institutions
International Institute of Space Commerce

References

Further reading 
 John Hickman. "Problems of Interplanetary and Interstellar Trade." Astropolitics. Vol.6, No. 1. (January 2008). pp. 95–104.
 The Political Economy of Very Large Space Projects by John Hickman
 
 
 

Trade
Spaceflight economics
Trade routes
Trade